Kim Massie (1956 or 1957 – October 12, 2020) was an American blues and soul singer who performed mostly in her native St. Louis, Missouri.

Though her earliest musical experiences were schooled in the gospel choirs of East St. Louis, Illinois, she has had no formal training as a vocalist. She spent her formative years in Lorain, OH, returning to St. Louis in 1999 to pursue her dreams of performing as a vocalist. She was discovered when she sat in with the St. Louis saxophonist Oliver Sain (1932–2003), and soon afterwards formed her own band, the Solid Senders.

She made frequent appearances at blues dance events and festivals coast to coast, including Blues Rising (San Francisco, 2007), the Emerald City Blues Festival (Seattle, 2009 and 2010).

Massie won two “Best Female vocalist of the Year” awards from the Riverfront Times and starred in the 2003 production of It Ain't Nothin' But the Blues by the St. Louis Black Repertory Theatre. In 2005, she won a Grand Center Visionary Award.

Massie died on October 12, 2020, at the age of 62.

References

External links
 
 

2020 deaths
20th-century African-American women singers
American blues singers
American women singers
American gospel singers
American soul singers
Musicians from St. Louis
Soul-blues musicians
St. Louis blues musicians
Urban blues musicians
Singers from Missouri
1956 births
21st-century African-American people
21st-century African-American women